Youngblood is the third studio album by Australian pop rock band 5 Seconds of Summer. The album was initially set to be released on 22 June 2018, but was later brought forward to 15 June. Four singles were released in support of the album: "Want You Back", "Youngblood", "Valentine" and "Lie to Me". The album was released to positive reviews, with critics praising the lyrical maturity and the sound change from their previous work. In support of the album, the band embarked on the Meet You There Tour.

As well as appearing on a multitude of weekly and 2018 and 2019 year-end charts over several countries and receiving multiple certifications, the album's title track, "Youngblood", impacted the ARIA decade-end chart (2010-2019), which ranks the most popular songs of the decade, at number thirty-seven. In the ARIA Australian decade-end chart (2010-2019), ranking the most popular songs of the decade by Australian artists, "Youngblood" ranked at number four. "Youngblood" sold over five million adjusted copies and is the most streamed Australian song of all time on Apple Music. According to ARIA certifications,"Youngblood" is the eleventh best-selling single in Australian history. Youngblood was the most-streamed Australian album of 2018. In February 2020, the band were honored in the APRA AMCOS' The 1,000,000,000 List, for "Youngblood" having been streamed over 1 billion times.

Background and recording 
Following the conclusion of the Sounds Live Feels Live World Tour on 5 October 2016, the band took off the remainder of the year as a break, before starting the writing process for their new album in the beginning of 2017. The song "Meet You There", which was released as a bonus track on the deluxe edition, was however written in late 2016. The last song written for the album was "Want You Back" in late 2017.

Guitarist Michael Clifford said of the process, "It's taking a really long time to perfect the new sound and direction we're taking. I think the reason it's taken so long is because we haven't just wanted to get it to a place where we're happy […] We want it to be perfect."

The album was almost exclusively recorded in Los Angeles, CA, primarily at Conway Recording Studios.

Promotion

5SOS III Promotional Tour 
Prior to the album's release, the band embarked on the worldwide promotional 5SOS III Tour, a four-leg tour which took place at 26 intimate venues. The tour sold out within approximately 3 minutes, with the critics praising it as "a nice teaser for what promises to be a much larger-scale fall tour." The tour began on 20 March 2018 and ended on 6 June.

Live performances and TV appearances
The band performed their lead single "Want You Back" on The Tonight Show Starring Jimmy Fallon on 11 April. They performed the single again on The Voice (U.S. season 14) on 8 May. On 25 May, the group performed for selected fans for a Spotify Fans First Event at Sydney, Australia. Spotify invited the band's top-streaming fans to watch the acoustic session. The band performed their second single "Youngblood" on The Voice Australia. They also performed it on BBC Radio 1's Live Lounge on 12 June, along with a cover of Alice Merton's "No Roots". On 22 June, the band performed on The Today Show's Summer Concert Series. They then collaborated with Tumblr and organized an intimate Tumblr IRL event for their fans on 25 June at Brooklyn, New York. On 1 August, the band released the Spotify-exclusive recording of their "Lie to Me" track, a stripped back version which was made available for streaming, along with a cover of Post Malone's "Stay".

Documentary and video series
Apple Music released the "On the Record: 5 Seconds of Summer – Youngblood" documentary, featuring interviews about the making of the album. Apple Music also organised a one-night show in New York on the release date of the album to showcase the short film. The band also performed for their fans. A recording of the full performance was released on Apple Music.

The band also released a series of short videos on YouTube, titled "5SOS Cocktail Chats", where they discussed the details of writing each track while drinking cocktails. There were seven episodes which were released on a weekly basis, usually every Monday of the week.
 Episode 1 – "Youngblood" and "Want You Back"
 Episode 2 – "Lie to Me" and "Valentine"
 Episode 3 – "Moving Along" and "Talk Fast"
 Episode 4 – "If Walls Could Talk" and "Better Man"
 Episode 5 – "More" and "Why Won't You Love Me"
 Episode 6 – "Empty Wallets"
 Episode 7 – "Woke Up in Japan" and "Ghost of You"

Tour
Prior to the album's release, the band embarked on the promotional 5SOS III Tour, which took place at 26 intimate concert venues worldwide. Along with gaining positive critic reviews, tickets for the tour sold out entirely within three minutes.

The Meet You There Tour was scheduled to visit Japan, New Zealand, Australia, Canada, US, and Europe. The tour began on 2 August 2018 and concluded on 19 November 2018. The tour was met with positive reviews, with Billboard praising the show for its "impressive" and "electric energy"

Singles
The album's lead single, "Want You Back", was released via Capitol Records on 22 February 2018. The album's title track, "Youngblood", was initially released as a promotional single on 13 April. It was later sent to American contemporary hit radio on 22 May as the album's second single. It has been since been certified as nine times platinum by Australian Recording Industry Association, platinum by Recorded Music New Zealand, platinum by British Phonographic Industry, and platinum by Recording Industry Association of America. "Valentine" was released on 26 August 2018 as the third single from the album. On 21 December 2018, a re-recorded version of "Lie to Me" featuring Julia Michaels was released as the album's fourth single.

Critical reception

Matt Collar of AllMusic wrote that the group embraced a "slick dance-pop sound" on their album and that "the transition to a streamlined, post-EDM-flavored sound isn't really a shock, even if it's a notable shift" while concluding that it is "a useful sound for 5SOS to embrace, and helps position them nicely as a lighter version of The 1975 or Imagine Dragons.

Brittany Spanos of Rolling Stone also commented on the transition and wrote that, "pop-punk is not a genre that's meant to carry a band through a full career. So it's not surprising that on their third album, [the group] have already aged out of the sound that built their success. Instead, Youngblood goes full pop, leaning into some Eighties inflection and foregoing the bratty, DGAF ethos of their earlier work." However, she also felt that, "[a] downside of the new sound is that the boys lose a little bit of the spunk that made them big in the first place. The snottiness of pop-punk highlighted their natural humor, and while they've certainly grown as musicians, singers and writers, a bit of that goofy charm is missing". Nick Hasted and Ilana Kaplan of The Independent opined that "the grit the band had on their first two records is definitely missed" but that "fans will probably still enjoy the sounds of 5SOS". Atlas Artist Group praised the album, referring to it as a "surprising and welcome departure from the sound that made them famous" and that the record "boasts solid tracks and hardly any filler." The article went on to say that it was "clear that [5 Seconds of Summer] spent their time honing a craft that’s been overlooked by stereotyping naysayers." and claimed that the record made them "a band that simply can’t be ignored." Ryan Ward of The Irish News named the record an "unmistakably pop album [that] is suitably edgy and reflective in parts" while writing that they "strengthen[ed] their position as the definitive pop-rock band of recent years" with Youngblood.

Chris DeVille of Stereogum wrote a less positive review, saying that the album "slips all the way into that lukewarm soup" and that "the longer Youngblood goes on, the less it holds together" while feeling that "5SOS really didn’t need to go this route" although he did compliment "Moving Along" and "Monster Among Men" as the album's highlights.

Accolades 
Alternative Press named the album in its Best Albums of 2018 list. At the 2018 ARIA Music Awards, the album won the annual ARIA Award for Best Group.

Commercial performance
Youngblood was a commercial success and debuted at number one in Australia, becoming 5 Seconds of Summer's third number-one album in their home country. It debuted atop the albums chart at the same week that the title track was number one for a fifth week on the singles chart. Youngblood was the most-streamed Australian album of 2018.

In the United States, it became their third number-one album on the Billboard 200 chart, debuting with 142,000 album-equivalent units, including 117,000 in pure album sales. The album debuted ahead of the Carters' (Beyoncé and Jay-Z) Everything Is Love, with industry forecasters initially unsure of which album would take the top spot. This made them the first Australian act with three number-one albums in the US. It also led to 5 Seconds of Summer being the first band (not vocal group) to have their first three full-length studio albums debut atop the Billboard 200. The album consecutively remained on the Billboard 200 chart for a total of 63 weeks (approximately one year and four months).

The album's title track single, "Youngblood" achieved worldwide success and with a third consecutive number one album in the US, 5 Seconds of Summer became the only band (not vocal group) in chart history to see its first three full-length studio albums enter the chart at No.1 on the Billboard 200. 5 Seconds of Summer also became the first and only Australian act in history to earn three number one albums on the Billboard charts. With a third No.1 in their home country, 5 Seconds of Summer became the second Australian band in history to have their first four full-length studio albums debut at number one on the ARIA albums chart.

"Youngblood" peaked in more than 15-year-end charts in 2018, was officially certified Australia's 2018 song of the year and won the ARIA Award for Song of the Year. The song was ranked at number seven in The UK's Official Top 40 Biggest Song of the Summer 2018. In 2019, "Youngblood" peaked in more than 10-year-end charts and has since received official platinum and gold notable achievement certifications in over 15 countries.

As well as appearing on a multitude of weekly and year-end charts over several countries and receiving multiple certifications, "Youngblood" impacted the ARIA decade-end chart (2010-2019), which ranks the most popular songs of the decade, at number thirty-seven. In the ARIA Australian decade-end chart (2010-2019), ranking the most popular songs of the decade by Australian artists, "Youngblood" ranked at number four. "Youngblood" sold over five million adjusted copies in the first six months of its release and is the most streamed Australian song of all time on Apple Music. In February 2020, 5 Seconds of Summer were honored in the APRA AMCOS' The 1,000,000,000 List, for "Youngblood" having been streamed over 1 billion times. In June 2020, "Youngblood" was awarded an ASCAP Pop Music Award.

As of June 2020, "Youngblood" has spent over 110 consecutive weeks (over 2 years) in the Top 20 on the ARIA Australian Singles chart.

Track listing

Notes
  signifies a co-producer
  signifies an additional producer

Charts

Weekly charts

Year-end charts

Certifications

References

2018 albums
5 Seconds of Summer albums
Capitol Records albums
Albums produced by Andrew Watt (record producer)
Albums produced by Louis Bell
Albums produced by Mike Elizondo
Albums produced by Sir Nolan
Albums produced by Andrew Goldstein (musician)
Albums produced by Rami Yacoub
Albums produced by Jake Sinclair (musician)